Xuanhe may refer to:

Xuanhe (1119–1125), reign period of Emperor Huizong of Song
Xuanhe, Ningxia, a town in Zhongwei, Ningxia, China
Xuanhe Township, Liancheng County, Fujian, China